Mizugaki is a climbing area in Japan, located in the northern part of the Yamanashi Prefecture. The forest of Mizugaki is owned by the Emperor of Japan.

It is known for highball bouldering and long trad lines.
The rock consists of granite with many natural pockets. 
Because of the higher altitude it is also possible to climb in Mizugaki during the summer.

Jason Kehl can be seen climbing in Mizugaki in the movie Big in Japan. He praises Mizugaki for its beautiful forest setting.

References

External links 
http://mountainproject.com/v/mizugaki-yama/107002228, short info on Mizugaki climbing
http://www.ogawayama.com/Mizugaki/30m_slab.html, online guide to Mizugaki climbing
http://www.videoclimb.com/2008/10/16/mizugaki-bouldering-in-japan-with-jason-khel-and-friends/, clip of Jason Kehl in Mizugaki

Climbing areas of Japan
Tourist attractions in Yamanashi Prefecture